Hamlin Rand Harding (April 14, 1825 - December 16, 1889) was a Massachusetts politician who served as a member of and President of the Cambridge, Massachusetts Common Council and the Mayor of Cambridge, Massachusetts.

Notes

Mayors of Cambridge, Massachusetts
Members of the Massachusetts House of Representatives
Cambridge, Massachusetts City Council members
1825 births
1889 deaths